The Empire Wrestling Federation (EWF) is an independent wrestling promotion based in Covina, California. It is owned and operated by Jesse Hernandez. The EWF is also tied to Hernandez's wrestling school, The School Of Hard Knocks. The EWF is the longest running promotion in Southern California, running continuously from 1996. The EWF is a former affiliate of the National Wrestling Alliance.

History
EWF was founded in 1996 by Bill Anderson and Jesse Hernandez.  The promotion's name comes from the Inland Empire, the popular name of the area surrounding San Bernardino.

It saw its first show in May 1996 at the Boys and Girls Club of San Bernardino as Bobby Bradley defeated Tom "Zuma" Howard to become the first EWF Heavyweight Champion. In 1999, Bill Anderson left the EWF and formed his own promotion and wrestling school, the International Wrestling Council in Riverside, California. In June 1996, a tribute to Superstar Billy Graham was held.

Several EWF wrestlers from the past have gone on to national fame, including Rico Constantino, Awesome Kong, Louie Spicolli, Frankie Kazarian, Christopher Daniels, Shelly Martinez and Melina Perez. In 1997, Chris Jericho and Lee Marshall of World Championship Wrestling (WCW) mentioned EWF on WCW broadcasts and Marshall attended a show in Hemet, California. Other pro wrestling stars have made appearance at EWF shows including Mando Guerrero, Peter Maivia, Ludvig Borga, The Honky Tonk Man, Tony Atlas and Tom Brandi. Many EWF wrestlers appear as jobbers on World Wrestling Entertainment (WWE) broadcasts, and at the 1999 Royal Rumble the orderlies sent to apprehend Kane were performed by the EWF roster, including then owners Bill Anderson and Jesse Hernandez.

They held their 20th Anniversary Extravaganza at the EWF Arena in Covina, Ca on May 6, 2016.

School of Hard Knocks
The EWF School of Hard Knocks is owned and operated by Jesse Hernandez and is currently located at the American Sports University, 399 North "D" Street in San Bernardino, CA. The School of Hard Knocks became the Official Training Facility of the National Wrestling Alliance in 2007 and has trained countless students from such countries as Canada, France, Australia, India, Great Britain, Russia, Mexico and others, in addition to those students who come to the school from all regions of the United States. The EWF's School of Hard Knocks has sent several wrestlers to prominent promotions across the globe including Melina, Rico Constantino, Frankie Kazarian, Awesome Kong, Rocky Romero, Ricky Reyes, Alex Koslov and Shelly Martinez. The School of Hard Knocks also has served as the training area for Chris Jericho, Layla, Eve Torres, Rhaka Khan, Lena Yada and others, who looked to brush up on their in-ring skills. The school and some of its students are set to be promoted in the upcoming reality show, "Slam School".

Current champions

Defunct championships
The EWF Cruiserweight Championship was introduced in 2004 and was won by Liger Rivera in a 4-Way match. It was defended from 2004 until it was retired in 2011. It had been featured in the EWF's Match of the Year in both 2009 and 2010. Ray Rosas was the last EWF Cruiserweight Champion. Also defunct was the women's championship belt. It has yet to be brought back into the company.

Annual events
The Empire Wrestling Federation previously held two annual events, the Great Goliath and the Inland Title Tournament. The Great Goliath is a battle royal, held in honor of the wrestler who trained Jesse Hernandez, the EWF's owner and promoter, it has been held during the EWF's Anniversary Extravaganza in May since 2006. The winner is awarded a shot at the EWF Heavyweight Championship.

Great Goliath Battle Royal

Inland Title Tournament / Series
Up until 2014 the EWF held the Inland Title Tournament. Originally conceived as a Round Robin Tournament it was later changed to a traditional single elimination format. The winner each year would receive an EWF Championship title match.

 2006: Joey Harder
 2007: Brandon Gatson
 2008:  Matt & Nick Jackson
 2009: SoCal Crazy
 2010: Tommy Wilson
 2011: Jeremy Jaeger
 2012: Sugar Sweet
 2013: N/A No tournament was held.
 2014: RJ Ruiz

Charity events
The Empire Wrestling Federation is always giving back to the communities it runs in. On March 10, 2012, the EWF put on a show for the students of Thompson Elementary School in Highland, CA. “Honestly, I see this as a way to keep the families engaged and involved,” said Principal Funchess, adding, “This is just a great opportunity for Thompson families to come enjoy a positive event here at the school while supporting academic achievement.”

In 2016 The Empire Wrestling Federation held an event at the Fox Theatre in San Bernardino to benefit victims of the 2015 San Bernardino Attack.

Hall of Fame
In 2016, EWF announced its first hall of Fame inductees, who were inducted in its 20th anniversary show in Covina California. The first Inductees were:
Melina Perez — Former EWF women's wrestler, and former three-time WWE Women's Champion and two-time WWE Divas Champion. She is also the first woman in WWE history to have held both titles on more than one occasion.

Bobby Bradley — The first EWF world champion who held the title three times.

Frankie Kazarian — Former EWF world and Tag Team champion who is most famous for wrestling for Total Nonstop Action Wrestling where he was Five time TNA X-Division and  three time TNA Tag team champion. He has held Ring Of Honor tag team championship once with Christopher Daniels and wrestled briefly in WWE.

The 2017 class included:
Vizzon — three-time EWF World Champion and three Time America Champion despite being legally blind.

Awesome Kong — Former EWF women's wrestler, Former two time TNA Knockouts Champion, Knockouts tag team Champion, NWA World Women's Champion, WWWA world Women's Champion, and  AWA Superstars of Wrestling Women's Champion as well as WWE Diva under the name of Karma. She was Pro Wrestling Illustrated's Woman of the Year in 2008

Jeff Walton — long time wrestling promoter and manager

Class of 2018 will be:
Rick Knox — referee

Los Chivos — Four time EWF world tag team Champions

Staff

Officials
 Owner / Promoter: Jesse Hernandez
 Commissioner: Frank Mott
 Deputy Commissioner: Jake Alexander
 Head of Security: Deek Valor

Referees
 Senior Official: Nick Lira
 Justin Borden
 Christopher Lee

Commentators

Ring announcers
 Jessica Walters — 2005-2006
 Mike Aguirre — 2005-2007
 Lalo Gonzalez — 2008-2010
 Josh Austin — 2010-2012
 Benjamin Tomas — 2012-2015
 Jake Alexander — 2014–present
 Brian White — 2015–present

See also
List of National Wrestling Alliance territories
List of independent wrestling promotions in the United States

References

External links
 1998 "Secrets of Pro Wrestling" Discovery Channel documentary that toured EWF facilities
 Newspaper article on EWF
 EWF newspaper article 2
 Nacho Libre presented by EWF and Krikorian Theatres
 EWF Newspaper article 3
 EWF at HollywoodReporter.com
 Throwing down for grades at Thompson
 Empire Wrestling Federation Official Website
 Empire Wrestling Live Website

1996 establishments in California
Independent professional wrestling promotions based in California
National Wrestling Alliance members